WZC may refer to:

 Wireless Zero Configuration, a component of modern Microsoft Windows operating systems
 World Zionist Congress, a gathering organised by the World Zionist Organization